IDFC Bharat Ltd is a microfinance bank (Formerly known as Grama Vidiyal), operating in the Tamil Nadu area of South India.  Since 1993, it has provided small loans to women without access to formal credit and who typically have daily incomes of less than INR 80 (US$2) per day.

History 
In 2007, Grama Vidiyal transformed from a charitable trust to a regulated Non-Bank Financial Company (NBFC).  Its status as an NBFC brings Grama Vidiyal under the purview of government regulation but will permit the firm to take on larger amounts of equity capital.  Grama Vidiyal expects continued rapid growth, reaching  more than two million clients by expanding to other states of India with an excess of Rs.15 billion (US$400,000,000) in loans outstanding by 2012.

Loan products
Grama Vidiyal offers a variety of loans to its members.

Other services

Grama Vidiyal is among the largest microinsurance providers in India, and was  studied by the ILO for a 2005 case study on microinsurance

Investors
Some of the most prominent investors include Vinod Khosla, co-founder of Sun Microsystems and former partner in the venture capital firm Kleiner Perkins.  Additional investment has come from the Unitus Equity Fund, a $23.6 million fund which invests in emerging microfinance institutions. 
In 2016, Grama Vidiyal was acquired by IDFC First Bank Ltd (formerly known as IDFC Bank Ltd) and name was changed to IDFC Bharat Ltd from Grama Vidiyal.

See also
Grameen Bank

Notes

External links
The Grameen Foundation
ASA-GV, The Activists for Social Alternatives - Grama Vidiyal
Sa-Dhan, The Association of Community Development Finance Institutions
Unitus Group, Market-based solutions to global poverty

Microfinance companies of India
Rural development organisations in India
Organisations based in Tamil Nadu
Microinsurance companies
Banks established in 1993
Indian companies established in 1993
1993 establishments in Tamil Nadu